The Agardhfjellet Formation is a geologic formation in Svalbard, Norway. It preserves fossils dating back to the Oxfordian to Berriasian stages, spanning the Late Jurassic-Early Cretaceous boundary. The formation contains the Slottsmøya Member, a highly fossiliferous unit (Lagerstätte) where many ichthyosaur and plesiosaur fossils have been found, as well as abundant and well preserved fossils of invertebrates.

Description 
The formation overlies the Knorringfjellet Formation and is overlain by the Rurikfjellet Formation. The formation comprises the lower Oppdalsåta and upper Slottsmøya Members. The Slottsmøya Member, which averages  in thickness in the study area, consists of dark-grey to black silty mudstone, often weathering to paper shale, and discontinuous silty beds with local occurrences of red to yellowish sideritic concretions as well as siderite and dolomite interbeds. It consists of a mix of shales and siltstones which were deposited in a shallow marine environment, near a patch of deeper marine sediment. Although direct evidence  from Slottsmøya is currently lacking, the high latitude of this site and relatively cool global climate of the Tithonian suggest that some sea ice may have been present at least in the winter. 

These sites represent shallow-water methane seeps which were spread over a relatively large geographic area, and like modern day seeps, they supported high biodiversity. Near the top of the member, various assemblages of invertebrates have been discovered; these include ammonites, bivalves, lingulate brachiopods, rhynchonellate brachiopods, tubeworms, belemnoids, tusk shells, sponges, crinoids, sea urchins, brittle stars, starfish, crustaceans, and gastropods, numbering 54 taxa in total. The most common and abundant of these taxa were bivalves and brachiopods, each of which make up 27.8% of the known seep fauna. Several chemosymbiotic species are known, such as the bivalve Nucinella. Outside of the cold seeps, several non-seep-restricted invertebrates were also present in abundance. In addition to the invertebrates, the Slottsmøya Member has also revealed a diverse assemblage of marine reptiles, including several taxa of ichthyosaurs and plesiosaurs. Many of these specimens are relatively complete and in articulation, which is rare among Jurassic marine fossil sites. It thus provides a unique and detailed glimpse into the boreal seas of the Late Jurassic. As it spans the Jurassic-Cretaceous boundary, it is also important to understanding how marine ecosystems changed going into the Cretaceous.

Paleobiota 

The formation, especially the Slottsmøya Member, has provided an abundance of marine fossils dating to the Late Jurassic-Early Cretaceous.

The timeline below follows stratigraphic data provided in Delsett et al. 2018 and Roberts et al. 2020.

Vertebrates

Bony fish

Plesiosaurs

Ichthyosaurs

Invertebrates 
An unnamed galatheid squat lobster is known from a single, poorly preserved fragment.

Cephalopods
Large belemnoid arm hooks are known.

Echinoderms

Bivalves 
Remains of possible anomiid clams have been found which are as yet undescribed.

Serpulids

Brachiopods

Gastropods

See also 
 List of fossiliferous stratigraphic units in Norway
 Tithonian formations
 Berriasian formations

References

Bibliography 

 
 
    
 
    
  
 
 
 

 
Geologic formations of Norway
Jurassic Norway
Lower Cretaceous Series of Europe
Cretaceous Norway
Mudstone formations
Dolomite formations
Deep marine deposits
Open marine deposits
Fossiliferous stratigraphic units of Europe
Paleontology in Norway
Geology of Svalbard
Tithonian Stage
Berriasian Stage
Jurassic System of Europe